Carlos Blanco Castañeda (5 March 1927 – 9 January 2011) was a Spanish-born Mexican footballer who played as a forward. He represented Mexico in the 1954 and 1958 FIFA World Cups, and played for Club Necaxa and Deportivo Toluca at club level.

References

External links
FIFA profile

1927 births
2011 deaths
Footballers from Madrid
Mexican footballers
Mexico international footballers
Association football forwards
Club Necaxa footballers
Deportivo Toluca F.C. players
Liga MX players
1954 FIFA World Cup players
1958 FIFA World Cup players
Spanish emigrants to Mexico